Andrew Stuart Tanenbaum (born March 16, 1944), sometimes referred to by the handle ast, is an American-Dutch computer scientist and professor emeritus of computer science at the Vrije Universiteit Amsterdam in the Netherlands.

He is the author of MINIX, a free Unix-like operating system for teaching purposes, and has written multiple computer science textbooks regarded as standard texts in the field. He regards his teaching job as his most important work. Since 2004 he has operated Electoral-vote.com, a website dedicated to analysis of polling data in federal elections in the United States.

Biography
Tanenbaum was born in New York City and grew up in suburban White Plains, New York. He is Jewish. His paternal grandfather was born in Khorostkiv in the Austro-Hungarian empire.

He received his Bachelor of Science degree in physics from MIT in 1965 and  his PhD degree in astrophysics from the University of California, Berkeley in 1971. Tanenbaum also served as a lobbyist for the Sierra Club.

He moved to the Netherlands to live with his wife, who is Dutch, but he retains his United States citizenship. He teaches courses on Computer Organization and Operating Systems and supervises the work of PhD candidates at the VU University Amsterdam. On July 9, 2014, he announced his retirement.

Teaching

Books
Tanenbaum's textbooks on computer science include:
 Structured Computer Organization (1976)
 Computer Networks, co-authored with David J. Wetherall and Nickolas Feamster (1981)
 Operating Systems: Design and Implementation, co-authored with Albert Woodhull (1987)
 Modern Operating Systems (1992)
 Distributed Operating Systems (1994)
 Distributed Systems: Principles and Paradigms, co-authored with Maarten van Steen (2001)

His book, Operating Systems: Design and Implementation and MINIX were Linus Torvalds' inspiration for the Linux kernel. In his autobiography Just for Fun, Torvalds describes it as "the book that launched me to new heights".

His books have been translated into many languages including Arabic, Basque, Bulgarian, Chinese, Dutch, French, German, Greek, Hebrew, Hungarian, Italian, Japanese, Korean, Macedonian, Mexican Spanish, Persian, Polish, Portuguese, Romanian, Russian, Serbian, and Spanish. They have appeared in over 175 editions and are used at universities around the world.

Doctoral students
Tanenbaum has had a number of PhD students who themselves have gone on to become widely known computer science researchers.
These include:
 Henri Bal, professor at the Vrije Universiteit in Amsterdam
 Frans Kaashoek, professor at MIT
 Sape Mullender, researcher at Bell Labs
 Robbert van Renesse, professor at Cornell University
 Leendert van Doorn, distinguished engineer at the Microsoft Corporation
 Werner Vogels, Chief Technology Officer at Amazon.com

Dean of the Advanced School for Computing and Imaging
In the early 1990s, the Dutch government began setting up a number of thematically oriented research schools that spanned multiple universities. These schools were intended to bring professors and PhD students from different Dutch (and later, foreign) universities together to help them cooperate and enhance their research.

Tanenbaum was one of the cofounders and first Dean of the Advanced School for Computing and Imaging (ASCI). This school initially consisted of nearly 200 faculty members and PhD students from the Vrije Universiteit, University of Amsterdam, Delft University of Technology, and Leiden University. They were especially working on problems in advanced computer systems such as parallel computing and image analysis and processing.

Tanenbaum remained dean for 12 years, until 2005, when he was awarded an Academy Professorship by the Royal Netherlands Academy of Arts and Sciences, at which time he became a full-time research professor. ASCI has since grown to include researchers from nearly a dozen universities in The Netherlands, Belgium, and France. ASCI offers PhD level courses, has an annual conference, and runs various workshops every year.

Projects

Amsterdam Compiler Kit
The Amsterdam Compiler Kit is a toolkit for producing portable compilers. It was started sometime before 1981 and Andrew Tanenbaum was the architect from the start until version 5.5.

MINIX
In 1987, Tanenbaum wrote a clone of UNIX, called MINIX (MINi-unIX), for the IBM PC. It was targeted at students and others who wanted to learn how an operating system worked. Consequently, he wrote a book that listed the source code in an appendix and described it in detail in the text. The source code itself was available on a set of floppy disks. Within three months, a Usenet newsgroup, comp.os.minix, had sprung up with over 40,000 subscribers discussing and improving the system. One of these subscribers was a Finnish student named Linus Torvalds, who began adding new features to MINIX and tailoring it to his own needs. On October 5, 1991, Torvalds announced his own (POSIX-like) kernel, called Linux, which originally used the MINIX file system but is not based on MINIX code.

Although MINIX and Linux have diverged, MINIX continues to be developed, now as a production system as well as an educational one. The focus is on building a highly modular, reliable, and secure operating system. The system is based on a microkernel, with only 5000 lines of code running in kernel mode. The rest of the operating system runs as a number of independent processes in user mode, including processes for the file system, process manager, and each device driver. The system continuously monitors each of these processes, and when a failure is detected is often capable of automatically replacing the failed process without a reboot, without disturbing running programs, and without the user even noticing. MINIX 3, as the current version is called, is available under the BSD license for free.

Research projects
Tanenbaum has also been involved in numerous other research projects in the areas of operating systems, distributed systems, and ubiquitous computing, often as supervisor of PhD students or a postdoctoral researcher. These projects include:
 Amoeba
 Globe
 Mansion
 Orca
 Paramecium
 RFID Guardian
 Turtle F2F

Electoral-vote.com
In 2004, Tanenbaum created Electoral-vote.com, a web site analyzing opinion polls for the 2004 U.S. Presidential Election, using them to project the outcome in the Electoral College. He stated that he created the site as an American who "knows first hand what the world thinks of America and it is not a pretty picture at the moment. I want people to think of America as the land of freedom and democracy, not the land of arrogance and blind revenge. I want to be proud of America again." The site provided a color-coded map, updated each day with projections for each state's electoral votes. Through most of the campaign period Tanenbaum kept his identity secret, referring to himself as "the Votemaster" and acknowledging only that he personally preferred John Kerry. Mentioning that he supported the Democrats, he revealed his identity on November 1, 2004, the day before the election, and also stating his reasons and qualifications for running the website.

Through the site he also covered the 2006 midterm elections, correctly predicting the winner of all 33 Senate races that year.

For the 2008 elections, he got every state right except for Indiana, which he said McCain would win by 2% (Obama won by 1%) and Missouri, which he said was too close to call (McCain won by 0.1%). He correctly predicted all the winners in the Senate except for Minnesota, where he predicted a 1% win by Norm Coleman over Al Franken. After 7 months of legal battling and recounts, Franken won by 312 votes (0.01%).

In 2010, he correctly projected 35 out of 37 Senate races in the Midterm elections on the website. The exceptions were Colorado and Nevada.

Electoral-vote.com incorrectly predicted Hillary Clinton would win the 2016 United States presidential election.  The website incorrectly predicted Clinton would win Wisconsin, Michigan, Pennsylvania, North Carolina, and Florida.  Electoral-vote.com did not predict a winner for Nevada, which Clinton would win.  The website predicted the winners of the remaining 44 states and the District of Columbia correctly.

Tanenbaum–Torvalds debate
The Tanenbaum–Torvalds debate was a famous debate between Tanenbaum and Linus Torvalds regarding kernel design on Usenet in 1992.

Awards
 Fellow of the ACM
 Fellow of the IEEE
 Member of the Royal Netherlands Academy of Arts and Sciences
 IEEE Computer Society Tech. Committee on Distributed Processing Outstanding Technical Achievement Award, 2022
 Eurosys Lifetime Achievement Award, 2015
 Honorary doctorate from Petru Maior University, Targu Mures, Romania, 2011
 Winner of the TAA McGuffey award for classic textbooks for Modern Operating Systems, 2010
 Coauthor of the Best Paper Award at the LADC Conference, 2009
 Winner of a 2.5 million euro European Research Council Advanced Grant, 2008
 USENIX Flame Award 2008  for his many contributions to systems design and to openness both in discussion and in source
 Honorary doctorate from Polytechnic University of Bucharest, Romania
 Coauthor of the Best Paper Award at the Real-Time and Network Systems Conf., 2008
 Winner of the 2007 IEEE James H. Mulligan, Jr. Education Medal
 Coauthor of the Best Paper Award at the USENIX LISA Conf., 2006
 Coauthor of the Best Paper for High Impact at the IEEE Percom Conf., 2006
 Academy Professor, 2004
 Winner of the 2005 PPAP Award for best education on computer science software
 Winner of the 2003 TAA McGuffey award for classic textbooks for Computer Networks
 Winner of the 2002 TAA Texty Award for new textbooks
 Winner of the 1997 ACM SIGCSE for contributions to computer science education
 Winner of the 1994 ACM Karl V. Karlstrom Outstanding Educator Award
 Coauthor of the 1984 ACM SOSP Distinguished Paper Award

Honorary doctorates

 On May 12, 2008, Tanenbaum received an honorary doctorate from Universitatea Politehnica din București. The award was given in the academic senate chamber, after which Tanenbaum gave a lecture on his vision of the future of the computer field. The degree was given in recognition of Tanenbaum's career work, which includes about 150 published papers, 18 books (which have been translated into over 20 languages), and the creation of a large body of open-source software, including the Amsterdam Compiler Kit, Amoeba, Globe, and MINIX.
 On October 7, 2011, Universitatea Petru Maior din Târgu Mureș (Petru Maior University of Târgu Mureș) granted Tanenbaum the Doctor Honoris Causa (honorary doctorate) title for his remarkable work in the field of computer science and achievements in education. The academic community is hereby honoring his devotion to teaching and research with this award. At the ceremony, the Chancellor, the Rector, the Dean of the Faculty of Sciences and Letters, and others all spoke about Tanenbaum and his work. The pro-rector then read the 'laudatio,' summarizing Tanenbaum's achievements. These include his work developing MINIX (the predecessor to Linux), the RFID Guardian, his work on Globe, Amoeba, and other systems, and his many books on computer science, which have been translated in many languages, including Romanian, and which are used at Petru Maior University.

Keynote talks
Tanenbaum has been keynote speaker at numerous conferences, most recently
 ICDCS 2022 Bologna, Italy, July 12, 2022
 Qualcomm Security Summit San Diego, May 18, 2022
 RIOT Summit 2020 Online Event, September 14, 2020
 FrOSCon 2015 Sankt Augustin, Germany, August 22, 2015
 BSDCan 2015 Ottawa, Canada, June 12, 2015
 HAXPO 2015  Amsterdam May 28, 2015
 Codemotion 2015  Rome Italy, March 28, 2015
 SIREN 2010 Veldhoven, The Netherlands, November 2, 2010
 FOSDEM Brussels, Belgium, February 7, 2010
 NSCNE '09 Changsha, China, November 5, 2009
 E-Democracy 2009 Conference Athens, Greece, September 25, 2009
 Free and Open Source Conference Sankt Augustin, Germany, August 23, 2008
 XV Semana Informática  of the Instituto Superior Técnico, Lisbon, Portugal, March 13, 2008
 NLUUG 25 year anniversary conference, Amsterdam, November 7, 2007
 linux.conf.au in Sydney, Australia, January 17, 2007
 Academic IT Festival in Cracow, Poland, February 23, 2006 (2nd edition)
 ACM Symposium on Operating System Principles, Brighton, England, October 24, 2005

References

External links

 Minix Article in Free Software Magazine contains an interview with Andrew Tanenbaum
 
 The MINIX 3 Operating System MINIX Official Website 

1944 births
American political writers
American male non-fiction writers
American technology writers
Computer systems researchers
American computer scientists
Fellows of the Association for Computing Machinery
Fellow Members of the IEEE
Free software programmers
Kernel programmers
Living people
MIT Department of Physics alumni
Members of the Royal Netherlands Academy of Arts and Sciences
MINIX
Scientists from New York City
University of California, Berkeley alumni
Academic staff of Vrije Universiteit Amsterdam
Information technology in the Netherlands
Computer science educators
Jewish American writers
European Research Council grantees
21st-century American Jews
American emigrants to the Netherlands